"Velcro Fly" is the fourth single off ZZ Top's 1985 album Afterburner. The song peaked at #15 on the Billboard Mainstream Rock chart, and #35 on the Billboard Hot 100 in 1986, the band's last ever top 40 hit.

A 12" version is featured on the box set Chrome, Smoke & BBQ.

Music video
The music video for "Velcro Fly" directed by Daniel Kleinman features female dancers choreographed by pop singer Paula Abdul.

The video was released on the DVD Greatest Hits: The Video Collection, along with other videos from the band's albums Eliminator and Recycler.

Reception
Robert Christgau called the song a "highlight" on Afterburner.   Cash Box called it a "seductive rocker that finds the 'Lil 01' Band From Texas' in its usual tongue-in-cheek mode."  Billboard called it a "techno-boogie stomper buried in fuzz and percussion."

In popular culture
The song appears in Stephen King's novel, The Dark Tower III: The Waste Lands, where in the series's post-apocalyptic alternate reality of Mid-World, the song's looped percussion intro, played via a large PA system in the decaying city of Lud, is referred to as "the God Drums". The city's barbaric inhabitants believe it to be sacred, and sacrifice themselves to the drumbeat. In the book, Eddie Dean asserts that the song was never released as a single in his world. In the audiobook an actual sample of Velcro Fly is used to accompany the narration.

Charts

Personnel
Billy Gibbons - guitar, vocals
Dusty Hill - keyboards
Frank Beard - drums

References

1985 songs
1986 singles
Songs written by Billy Gibbons
Songs written by Dusty Hill
Songs written by Frank Beard (musician)
ZZ Top songs
Warner Records singles
Song recordings produced by Bill Ham